Red Dress or The Red Dress may refer to:

Film, stage, and television
 The Red Dress (La robe rouge), a 1900 play by Eugène Brieux
 The Red Dress, a 1933 French film based on the 1900 play by Eugène Brieux
 Red Dress (Malcolm in the Middle), an episode of the American sitcom Malcolm in the Middle
 The Red Dress, a 2015 television film starring Rachel Skarsten

Music
 "Red Dress" (Sugababes song), a song by Sugababes from the album Taller in More Ways
 "Red Dress" (Sarah Brand song), a 2021 song by Sarah Brand
 "Red Dress", a song by Lucy Hale from the album Road Between
 "Red Dress", song by Canadian band Magic! from their 2016 album Primary Colours
 "Red Dress", a song by James McMurtry, from the albums, Saint Mary of the Woods and Live in Aught-Three
 "Red Dress", a song by Andrew Ridgeley from the album Son of Albert
 "Red Dress," a song from TV on the Radio's 2008 album Dear Science

Events and projects
 Red Dress (embroidery project), international collaborative project created 2009-2022
 Red Dress Day, event remembering Missing and Murdered Indigenous Women and Girls in Canada
 Red Dress Gala, a fundraiser to raise awareness of heart disease
 REDress Project, Canadian art installation begun in 2010, using red dresses

Other uses
Red Dress Boutique, American online clothing retailer
Red dress party, LGBT event
 Red dress run, a race run while wearing a red dress

See also